Echinanthera melanostigma  is a species of snake of the family Colubridae. The species is found in Brazil.

References

Echinanthera
Endemic fauna of Brazil
Reptiles of Brazil
Reptiles described in 1824
Taxa named by Johann Georg Wagler